Hezari or Hazari may refer to:
 Hezari, Chabahar
 Hezari, Qasr-e Qand